This will be the 26th edition of Kuwait Crown Prince Cup where the 15 teams are in a knockout stage.

Qadsia SC are the defending champions.

Bracket
Draw was held on 24 July 2018.

Note:     H: Home team,   A: Away team

References

External links
Kuwaiti Crown Prince Cup 2018/2019, Goalzz.com

Kuwait Crown Prince Cup
Kuwait Crown Prince Cup
Crown Prince Cup